SmartPLS is a software with graphical user interface for variance-based structural equation modeling (SEM) using the partial least squares (PLS) path modeling method. Users can estimate models with their data by using basic PLS-SEM, weighted PLS-SEM (WPLS), consistent PLS-SEM (PLSc-SEM), and sumscores regression algorithms. The software computes standard results assessment criteria (e.g., for the reflective and formative measurement models and the structural model, including the HTMT criterion, bootstrap based significance testing, PLSpredict, and goodness of fit) and it supports additional statistical analyses (e.g., confirmatory tetrad analysis, higher-order models, importance-performance map analysis, latent class segmentation, mediation, moderation, measurement invariance assessment, multigroup analysis).
Since SmartPLS is programmed in Java, it can be executed and run on different computer operating systems such as Windows and Mac.

See also
Estimation theory
Partial least squares path modeling
Partial least squares regression
Principal component analysis
Regression analysis
Regression validation
WarpPLS

References

2005 software
Data analysis software
Java platform software